Yang Seung-pil (born January 3, 1992) is a South Korean former actor. He made his acting debut in the television series The Heirs (2013).

Filmography

Television series

References

External links
 

1992 births
Living people
Konkuk University alumni
Male actors from Seoul
South Korean male television actors
21st-century South Korean male actors